A constitutional referendum was held in the Russian republic of Chechnya on 2 December 2007, together with the Russian parliamentary elections. Among the changes proposed were:

 extension of the mandates of president from four to five years and of parliament from four to five years;
 removing restrictions on presidential terms
 adopting a unicameral parliament with 41 MPs (instead of the 58 MPs the lower house had up to that date);
 let future constitutional changes be decided by parliament.

The referendum succeeded with 85% of the vote in favour.

See also
Politics of Chechnya

References

Referendums in Russia
2007 elections in Russia
2007 referendums
Elections in Chechnya
Constitutional referendums
2007 in Chechnya